The Hague Protection of Adults Convention, formally the Convention on the International Protection of Adults, is a convention concluded by the Hague Conference on Private International Law in 2000. The convention entered into force in 2009 and currently applies in ten states. The convention is aimed at the protection of vulnerable adults, persons who are "by reason of an impairment or insufficiency of their personal faculties, are not in a position to protect their interests". The convention
determines which courts have jurisdiction to take protection measures
determines which law is to be applied in the circumstances; and who may be a vulnerable person
establishes a system of central authorities which should cooperate, locate vulnerable adults and give information on the status of vulnerable persons to other authorities.

Parties
As of March 2023, the convention applies in fifteen states.

References

Hague Conference on Private International Law conventions
Treaties concluded in 2000
Treaties entered into force in 2009
Family law treaties
Vulnerable adults
Treaties of Austria
Treaties of Belgium
Treaties of Cyprus
Treaties of the Czech Republic
Treaties of Estonia
Treaties of Finland
Treaties of France
Treaties of Germany
Treaties of Greece
Treaties of Latvia
Treaties of Malta
Treaties of Monaco
Treaties of Portugal
Treaties of Switzerland
Treaties of Scotland